Biomorph may refer to:
 A shape resembling that of a living organism (such as bacteria), though not necessarily of biotic origin
 One of the virtual creatures in a computer simulation described by Richard Dawkins in his book The Blind Watchmaker
 In biomorphism, shapes that derive their form from nature as with contemporary architecture art
 One of the organic creatures in the art of surrealist painters such as Salvador Dalí or Yves Tanguy
 One of the mysterious alien creatures in the book Империя Превыше Всего (Empire Above All) by Nick Perumov
 Various fractals, particularly Pickover biomorphs, which are computer generated graphics from mathematical chaos modelisation